Golden croaker may be a common name for several species of croaker:

Roncador stearnsii
Micropogonias undulatus
Umbrina roncador
Umbrina xanti